Gerónimo Peña Martínez (born March 29, 1967) is a Dominican former professional baseball second baseman who played in Major League Baseball (MLB) for the St. Louis Cardinals and Cleveland Indians from 1990–1996.

Playing career
Gerónimo Peña made his major league debut on September 5, 1990, for the St. Louis Cardinals versus the Montreal Expos, collecting his first major league hit.

In 1991, Peña appeared in a career-high 104 games, scored 38 runs and stole 15 bases, both also career-highs, and batted .262 with eight doubles, three triples, five home runs, and 17 runs batted in (RBI).

In 1992, Peña hit career-bests of .305 and .863 on-base plus slugging (OPS) in 62 games and 236 plate appearances. 

On July 1, 1996, the Cardinals released Peña, making him a free agent.  He signed with the Cleveland Indians that same day.

In 378 games over seven major league seasons, Gerónimo Peña batted .262 (265-for-1010) with 162 runs scored, 30 home runs, 124 RBI, 54 stolen bases and 112 walks.

Personal life
Peña's nephew, Ramses Peña, is also a professional baseball player, having signed with the Pittsburgh Pirates in 2009.  His son, Jeremy Peña, is a shortstop and World Series MVP who plays for the Houston Astros and made his MLB debut in 2022. The Peña family moved to Providence, Rhode Island when Jeremy was nine.

See also

 List of Major League Baseball players from the Dominican Republic

References

External links
 Baseball Reference

1967 births
Living people
Cleveland Indians players
Dominican Republic expatriate baseball players in the United States
Major League Baseball players from the Dominican Republic
Major League Baseball second basemen
St. Louis Cardinals players
Arkansas Travelers players
Buffalo Bisons (minor league) players
Johnson City Cardinals players
Louisville Redbirds players
Savannah Cardinals players
St. Petersburg Cardinals players